Chalcolepidius limbatus is a species of beetles in the family Elateridae.

Description
The coloration is quite variable and may be green, olive-brown or yellowish. It shows lateral stripes on the pronotum.

Distribution
This species occurs in Argentina

References 
 Elateridae de Argentina
 Sônia Aparecida Casari  Review of the genus Chalcolepidius Eschscholtz, 1829 (Coleoptera, Elateridae, Agrypninae)

External links

 Living Jewels
 Ecoregistros

limbatus
Beetles described in 1829